The women's 200 metre individual medley event at the 11th FINA World Swimming Championships (25m) took place 15 December 2012 at the Sinan Erdem Dome.

Records
Prior to this competition, the existing world and championship records were as follows.

The following records were established during the competition:

Results

Heats

Final

The final was held at 20:24.

References

Individual medley 200 metre, women's
World Short Course Swimming Championships
2012 in women's swimming